Kivisild is an Estonian surname meaning "stone bridge"; a compound of kivi ("stone") and  sild ("bridge").

As of 1 January 2023, 133 men and 171 women have the surname Kivisild in Estonia. Kivisild ranks 545th for men and 428th for women in terms of surname distribution in the country.

Notabale people with the surname Kivisild include:

Janno Kivisild (born 1977), football coach
Meelis Kivisild (born 1990), volleyball player
Toomas Kivisild (born 1969), population geneticist

References

Estonian-language surnames